Whiplash is an American thrash metal band formed in 1984 in Passaic, New Jersey. The band has been centered around guitarist and vocalist Tony Portaro, who is the only constant member of the lineup. Despite never achieving major success, Whiplash has been recognized as one of the first East Coast thrash metal bands in the 1980s, and they are also notable for featuring drummer Tony Scaglione, who had been in and out of Whiplash since its inception and was a temporary fill-in for Dave Lombardo in Slayer on the latter's Reign in Blood tour.

History
The original lineup of Tony Portaro, Tony Scaglione and Tony Bono recorded their debut album Power and Pain for Roadrunner Records in 1986. Joe Cangelosi replaced Tony Scaglione that same year when the latter left for a seven-week tour with Slayer. Joe Cangelosi recorded Ticket to Mayhem in 1987 with the two Tonys. In 1989, Glenn Hansen joined the band as the new singer for the album titled Insult to Injury. The band split up due to business reasons, but reunited in 1995 after Portaro and Scaglione joined forces in a revamped lineup of Billy Milano's M.O.D. for a European tour. Whiplash released two further albums, Cult of One and Sit, Stand, Kneel, Prey before the three Tonys recorded a final album together in 1998, Thrashback.

Bassist Tony Bono died in 2002 after suffering a heart attack, at the age of 38.

In 2009, founding member Tony Portaro and Joe Cangelosi reformed the band, adding bassist Rich Day, and recorded Unborn Again, released in September 2009. Whiplash played many festivals in Europe that year including Wacken Open Air in Germany, Jalometalli festival in Finland and shows in Italy, Norway, Mexico and Colombia.

In 2010, the band took a limited break due to personal legal reasons. In early December 2010, Tony Portaro announced the return of their original drummer, Tony Scaglione, to the band. They recruited New York bassist David DeLong, a Pennsylvania-Dutch native, with music influences from the 1980s New York metal/hardcore/punk scene. However, after two weeks, Tony Scaglione announced personal scheduling issues became his priority. With the help of Ben Ward of Orange Goblin and Nathan Perrier of Alabaster Suns, Labrat and Capricorns, Dan "Loord" Foord (SikTh) entered into the band.

Whiplash launched their Power and Pain 2011 tour with dates in Greece and Italy in April 2011. Following performances at Hellfest (France) and Portaro's hometown of Clifton, New Jersey, Whiplash headlined at the San Francisco festival Slaughter by the Water 2. After returning from California, they began writing new material, and held another New Jersey performance before finishing their tour with three shows in Chile. In January 2012, Whiplash headlined thrash metal shows in Philadelphia and New Jersey before embarking on the heavy metal cruise 70000 Tons of Metal aboard the Royal Caribbean ship Majesty of the Seas. In March and April, Whiplash performed at shows in the Netherlands, and at the Keep It True festival in Germany and the SWR Barroselas Metalfest in Portugal. The band also headlined at the Convivencia Rock festival in Pereira, Colombia in July 2012.

On October 10, 2015, Whiplash announced they were reuniting with original drummer Tony Scaglione. However, this reunion did not last for long, and the band replaced him with Tom Tierney, who was later replaced by former Overkill drummer Ron Lipnicki.

In July 2018, Whiplash signed with Metal Blade Records, and their eighth studio album Old School American Way is expected to be released in 2023.

Band members

Current
 Tony Portaro – guitars, lead vocals (1984–1999, 2007–present)
 David DeLong – bass, backing vocals (2011–present)
 Ron Lipnicki – drums (2018–present)

Timeline

Discography

Demos
Fire Away (1984)
Thunderstruk (1984)
Looking Death in the Face (1985)
Untitled 3-track demo (1985)

Albums
Power and Pain (1986)
Ticket to Mayhem (1987)
Insult to Injury (1989)
Cult of One (1996)
Sit Stand Kneel Prey (1997)
Thrashback (1998)
Unborn Again (2009)
Old School American Way (TBA)

References

External links

1984 establishments in New Jersey
American musical trios
American thrash metal musical groups
Heavy metal musical groups from New Jersey
Musical groups established in 1984